Mount Penrose, is a mountain in the Flathead Range of the Rocky Mountains in Montana, United States.

See also
Boies Penrose
Penrose Peak (Montana)
Mount Penrose (British Columbia, Canada)

References

Mountains of Flathead County, Montana
Rocky Mountains
Mountains of Montana